Usoyka is a village in Boboshevo Municipality, Kyustendil Province, south-western Bulgaria. As of 2013 it has 394 inhabitants.

Citations 

Villages in Kyustendil Province